Charles Tupper (1821–1915) served as the sixth prime minister of Canada.

A number of notable buildings have been named for Charles Tupper, which include:
Sir Charles Tupper Building, Ottawa, Ontario
Sir Charles Tupper Secondary School, Vancouver, British Columbia

Other notable people with the name include:
Charles Hibbert Tupper (1855–1927), Canadian politician, member of the House of Commons for Pictou, and son of Charles Tupper
Charles H. P. Tupper (1887–1950), Canadian politician, MLA for British Columbia
Charles Tupper Jr. (born 1942), American politician, member of the Texas House of Representatives